Malebo Airport  is an airstrip serving the hamlet of Malebo in Mai-Ndombe Province, Democratic Republic of the Congo.

See also

Transport in the Democratic Republic of the Congo
List of airports in the Democratic Republic of the Congo

References

External links
FallingRain - Malebo Airport
HERE Maps - Malebo
OpenStreetMap - Malebo
OurAirports - Malebo

Airports in Mai-Ndombe Province